The 2021 Texas's 6th congressional district special election was held on May 1, 2021. The seat became vacant after incumbent Republican Ron Wright died on February 7 of COVID-19.

Ron Wright's widow, Susan Wright from Arlington, who was endorsed by former President Donald Trump, and Jake Ellzey (who lost the Republican primary for this seat to Ron Wright in 2018) of Waxahachie, who served as a member of the Texas House of Representatives starting on January 12, advanced to the runoff. Ellzey finished ahead of Democrat Jana Lynne Sanchez of Fort Worth for the second place by just 354 votes. Sanchez conceded defeat to Ellzey the day after the election. The district was a Republican hold due to two Republicans advancing to the runoff.

The special election was expected to be competitive, due to the district trending Democratic in recent years and its suburban nature. A nonpartisan blanket primary took place, in which all candidates were listed on the same ballot. Since no candidate had received over 50 percent of the vote, the race proceeded to a runoff between the top two candidates in the first round, resulting in two Republicans advancing to the runoff. The runoff took place on July 27. Ellzey won the runoff election, earning 53.3% to Wright's 46.7%.

Candidates

Republican Party

Declared
Michael Ballantine, business and English lecturer
John Anthony Castro, attorney and candidate for U.S. Senate in 2020
Mike Egan, former U.S. Army Special Forces Officer (Green Beret) and businessman
Brian Harrison, former chief of staff of Department of Health and Human Services (2019–2021)
Sery Kim, former SBA official
Travis Rodermund, police officer
Dan Rodimer, former WWE professional wrestler and nominee for Nevada's 3rd congressional district in 2020
Jennifer Garcia Sharon, volunteer caregiver and nominee for Texas's 35th congressional district in 2020
Michael Wood, major in the U.S. Marine Corps Reserve
Susan Wright, widow of former U.S. Representative Ron Wright (2019–2021) and a committeewoman for the Texas State Republican Executive Committee (SREC) for District 10.

Filed paperwork
Monty Markland, writer and producer
Asa Palagi, former candidate for Governor of Washington in 2020

Declined
Joe Barton, former U.S. Representative for 
David Cook, state representative (2021–present)
David Hill, Mayor of Waxahachie
Cary Moon, Fort Worth city councillor
Andy Nguyen, deputy chief of staff for Rep. Wright
Adrian Mizher, banker (running as an Independent)
Katrina Pierson, former national spokesperson for Donald Trump's 2016 presidential campaign and senior advisor to Donald Trump's 2020 presidential campaign
Manny Ramirez, President of the Fort Worth Police Officers Association
Tony Tinderholt, state representative (2015–present)
Bill Waybourn, Tarrant County sheriff
Jeff Williams, Mayor of Arlington (2015–present) (endorsed Susan Wright)

Democratic Party

Declared
Lydia Bean, small business owner, former state House candidate
Daryl J. Eddings, business owner
Matthew Hinterlong, developer
Tammy Allison Holloway, attorney
Shawn Lassiter, Leadership ISD Chief of Equity and Inclusion
 Patrick Moses, former Assistant Director for Field Operations, Department of Homeland Security and Minister
Manuel R. Salazar, realtor
Brian K. Stephenson, systems engineer
Chris Suprun, paramedic and Republican faithless elector in 2016

Declined
Chris Turner, Minority Leader of the Texas House of Representatives

Libertarian Party

Declared
Phil Gray, property manager

Independent

Declared
Adrian Mizher, banker

Endorsements

Primary

Polling

Graphical summary

Predictions

Results 
Susan Wright came in first in the primary with 15,077 (19.2%) votes to Ellzey's 10,865 (13.8%) and Sanchez's 10,518 (13.4%). On Sunday, May 2, 2021, Sanchez conceded the race to Ellzey. Since no candidate received a majority, the top two candidates, Wright and Ellzey, proceeded to a runoff.

Runoff 
A runoff was held on July 27 between Susan Wright and Jake Ellzey. In the campaign prior to the runoff, Wright relied heavily on Trump's endorsement in order to further her candidacy, but was considered to have run a poor campaign. The Club for Growth spent heavily in the runoff, buying US $1.2 million in advertisements that supported Wright and attacked Ellzey. The heavily negative tone taken by the Club for Growth ads towards Ellzey frustrated many Republican officials, some of whom backed Ellzey in protest. Ellzey's campaign also engaged in strategies that were suspected as being designed to appeal to Democrats, with him declaring himself a "champion of public education" in text messages to Democratic-leaning potential voters, as well as noting that Wright was endorsed by former President Donald Trump. Defending Main Street, a Super PAC that was supporting Ellzey, targeted Democrats with advertisements, but Ellzey himself denied that he was specifically targeting Democrats, instead claiming that his statements were designed to be bipartisan.

Predictions

Endorsements

Polling 

Susan Wright vs. Jana Sanchez

Generic Republican vs. generic Democrat

Results

By county

Notes

Partisan clients

References

External links
Official websites of candidates
 Jake Ellzey (R) for Congress
 Susan Wright (R) for Congress

Texas 2021 06
Texas 2021 06
2021 06 Special
Texas 06 Special
United States House of Representatives 06 Special
United States House of Representatives 2021 06